The Nakayama Kinen is a Japanese Grade 2 flat horse race in Japan for Thoroughbreds aged four and older run over a distance of 1,800 metres at the Nakayama Racecourse, Funabashi, Chiba. The race is run in late February or early March.

The race was first run in 1937. It was originally run twice a year, in spring and autumn, before a single annual race was established in 1952. Among the winners of the race have been Silence Suzuka, Victoire Pisa and Just A Way.

Records
Most successful horse (2 wins):
 Kane Mikasa – 1978, 1979
 Eighty Tosho – 1982, 1983
 Lohengrin – 2003, 2007
 Balance of Game – 2005, 2006
 Company – 2008, 2009
 Win Bright – 2018, 2019

Winners since 1990

Earlier winners

 1952 - Kiyo Strong
 1953 - Brulette
 1954 - Cheerio
 1955 - Takagiku
 1956 - Hide Homare
 1957 - My Way
 1958 - Mitsuru
 1959 - Fillie
 1960 - Harrow More
 1961 - Onward Stan
 1962 - Gin Toshi
 1963 - Nasuno Midori
 1964 - Toast
 1965 - Sweet Lapel
 1966 - Fuji Isami
 1967 - Onward Hill
 1968 - Shesky
 1969 - Meiji Shiro
 1970 - Akatsuki Teru
 1971 - Hida President
 1972 - Tosho Pit
 1973 - Jinden
 1974 - Haiseko
 1975 - Hikaru Jinden
 1976 - Yamabuki O
 1977 - Eyeful
 1978 - Kane Mikasa
 1979 - Kane Mikasa
 1980 - Yoshinosky
 1981 - Kitano Riki O
 1982 - Eighty Tosho
 1983 - Eighty Tosho
 1984 - Tudenham King
 1985 - Tosho Pegasus
 1986 - Kushiro King
 1987 - Suzu Parade
 1988 - Mogami Yashima
 1989 - Kosei

See also
 Horse racing in Japan
 List of Japanese flat horse races

References

Turf races in Japan